Nanxi Township is a township under the administration of Taihe County in western Jiangxi, China. , it administers Baizhu Residential Neighborhood and the following eight villages:
Kuangxi Village
Fangqiao Village
Zhouwei Village
Yuantou Village
Nanyuan Village
Jinxi Village
Shanglong Village
Wuxing Village

References 

Township-level divisions of Jiangxi
Taihe County, Jiangxi